William Johnston (24 August 1867 – 14 September 1947) was a New Zealand cricketer. He played twenty first-class matches for Otago between 1889 and 1903.

See also
 List of Otago representative cricketers

References

External links
 

1867 births
1947 deaths
New Zealand cricketers
Otago cricketers
Cricketers from Edinburgh